Ulrick Chavas (born 17 October 1980, in Firminy) is a French former professional footballer who played as a midfielder.

Chavas previously played for Toulouse FC and Vannes OC in Ligue 2.

Honours
Vannes
 Coupe de la Ligue: runner-up 2008–09

References

1980 births
Living people
People from Firminy
Sportspeople from Loire (department)
French footballers
Footballers from Auvergne-Rhône-Alpes
Association football midfielders
Ligue 2 players
Toulouse FC players
FC Sète 34 players
Nîmes Olympique players
AS Moulins players
Vannes OC players
FC Martigues players
ES Uzès Pont du Gard players